Benjamin Dunlop Dagwell (July 21, 1890 - June 2, 1963) was fifth bishop of the Episcopal Diocese of Oregon, serving from 1936 to 1958. He was consecrated on February 12, 1936.

References 
History of the Diocese of Oregon

1890 births
1963 deaths
Place of birth missing
Episcopal Church in Oregon
20th-century American Episcopalians
Episcopal bishops of Oregon
20th-century American clergy